Filsports Basketball Association (FBA) was a regional grassroots amateur basketball league based in the Philippines, aiming to discover young and talented basketball players from the provinces and regions. Formed in January 2015, by a group of basketball stakeholders including former Brgy. Ginebra San Miguel player Vince Hizon and LJ Serrano, the FBA is sanctioned by the Samahang Basketbol ng Pilipinas in accordance to the FIBA rules.

The opening of the inaugural conference of the FBA was commenced on January 24, 2015, at the Malolos Sports Complex in Bulacan, consisting of the exhibition game between the PBA Legends and the Malolos Agilas team. The inaugural conference is consisting of 8 teams, including the Foton Tornadoes, the first franchise team of the FBA. Eventually, the UP Fighting Maroons basketball team bringing home the crown of the inaugurals.

The second conference of the FBA was launched on October 23 in Marikina Sports Complex. Followed this is the appointment of their new Chief Operating Officer Claudia Perrine. The second conference was dominated by Pampanga Foton Toplanders, led by former UP player and current NCAA broadcast team analyst Mikee Reyes after they beating the Manila-NU Bulldogs in a three-game battle for the championship title.

Games was aired on AksyonTV and Net 25 on free TV, Fox Sports 1 on cable TV and internationally via AksyonTV International.

Former teams

Manila - National University Bulldogs (Team B)
Quezon City - UP Fighting Maroons (Team B)
Pateros - Austen Morris Associates
Marikina - Wang's Ballclub Deliverers
Malolos - Mighty Sports/BulSU Golden Gears
Pampanga - Foton Toplanders
Antipolo - Wang's Ballclub Pilgrims
Laguna - BUSA Warriors
Manila - Metro Racal Autocenter Artemis

Champions
2015 Inaugural Conference: UP Fighting Maroons
2015 Second Conference: Pampanga Foton Toplanders

Most Valuable Player:
2015 Inaugural Conference: 
Conference MVP: Levy Hernandez
Finals MVP: Paul Desiderio
2015 Second Conference:
Conference MVP: Levy Hernandez
Finals MVP: Allan Mangahas

References

Defunct basketball leagues in the Philippines
Sports leagues established in 2015
2015 establishments in the Philippines